Nick Hoffman (born May 1, 1992) is an American professional racing driver and chassis builder. He currently competes in the DIRTcar UMP Modified Series, and has previously driven in the NASCAR Camping World Truck Series.

Racing career

NASCAR Camping World Truck Series
Hoffman made his racing debut in 2010, where he drove the No. 63 Ford for MB Motorsports.

Hoffman ran two races in 2011, staying in the No. 63. He finished 34th at Nashville and 25th at Kansas.

In 2018, Hoffman returned to NASCAR, driving the No. 83 for MB Motorsports in the Eldora Dirt Derby, where he had a career best finish of 10th.

Motorsports career results

NASCAR
(key) (Bold – Pole position awarded by qualifying time. Italics – Pole position earned by points standings or practice time. * – Most laps led.)

Camping World Truck Series

 Season still in progress
 Ineligible for series points

References

Living people
1992 births
NASCAR drivers
Racing drivers from North Carolina

External links